Anna Chakvetadze was the champion when the event was last held in 2010, but she retired from professional tennis in 2013.

Jasmine Paolini won her maiden WTA Tour title, defeating Alison Riske in the final, 7–6(7–4), 6–2.

Seeds

Draw

Finals

Top half

Bottom half

Qualifying

Seeds

Qualifiers

Qualifying draw

First qualifier

Second qualifier

Third qualifier

Fourth qualifier

Fifth qualifier

Sixth qualifier

References

External links
 Main draw
 Qualifying draw

Zavarovalnica Sava Portorož - Singles